Walthamstow (Contemp. and Cons. RP: , Est. Eng.: //) is a constituency created in 1974 represented in the House of Commons of the UK Parliament since 2010 by Stella Creasy, a member of the Labour Co-op party.  An earlier version of the constituency existed covering a significantly different area (1885–1918) and was among the vast majority by that time returning one member to the House of Commons.

Boundaries

1885–1918 

The South-Western or Walthamstow Division of the parliamentary county of Essex was created by the Redistribution of Seats Act 1885, when the existing seat of South Essex was divided into three single-member constituencies.

The constituency consisted of the three civil parishes of Leyton, Wanstead and Walthamstow. The area lay on the periphery of the London conurbation and became increasingly suburban over its existence.

The seat was abolished under the Representation of the People Act 1918. Two new constituencies were created with Walthamstow Urban District divided between Walthamstow East and Walthamstow West.

1974 – date 
1974–1983: The London Borough of Waltham Forest wards of Higham Hill, High Street, Hoe Street, St James Street, and Wood Street.

1983–1997: As above plus Lloyd Park.

1997–2010: As above plus Chapel End and Lea Bridge.

2010–present: The London Borough of Waltham Forest wards of Chapel End, Higham Hill, High Street, Hoe Street, Lea Bridge, Markhouse, William Morris, and Wood Street.

History
The seat has been represented by the Labour Party since 1992, before which it was won on a marginal majority in 1987 by a Conservative, having until then (since its 1974 recreation as a seat) been served by one Labour MP, Eric Deakins.

In 2015, Creasy's re-election saw Walthamstow become Labours' second-safest London seat, and tenth-safest nationally.

Prominent frontbenchers
Stella Creasy, the present member, was the Shadow Minister for Crime Prevention.

Constituency profile
The seat is the part of Outer London closest to Stratford, with its international rail connections, major city shopping centre and London's Olympic Park.  To the East the seat borders Walthamstow Forest and Gilbert's Slade, thin sections of Epping Forest, and to the West, the Lea Valley.  The eponymous district had as its open space feature a greyhound racing track, which has been redeveloped into a modernist housing and green space scheme.  Workless claimants, registered jobseekers, were in November 2012 significantly higher than the national average of 3.8% and Greater London average of 4%, at 7.2% of the population based on a statistical compilation by The Guardian.

Members of Parliament

Election results

Elections in the 2010s

Elections in the 2000s

Elections in the 1990s

Elections in the 1980s

Elections in the 1970s

Elections in the 1910s
General Election 1914–15:
Another General Election was required to take place before the end of 1915. The political parties had been making preparations for an election to take place and by the July 1914, the following candidates had been selected; 
Liberal: Emslie Horniman
Unionist: Stanley Johnson

Elections in the 1900s

Elections in the 1890s

Elections in the 1880s

See also 
 List of parliamentary constituencies in London

Notes

References
Specific

General

External links 
Politics Resources (Election results from 1922 onwards)
Electoral Calculus (Election results from 1955 onwards)

Politics of the London Borough of Waltham Forest
Parliamentary constituencies in London
Constituencies of the Parliament of the United Kingdom established in 1885
Constituencies of the Parliament of the United Kingdom disestablished in 1918
Constituencies of the Parliament of the United Kingdom established in 1974
Walthamstow